Edgard Philippe Diafouka-Bambela (born 19 June 1947) is a Congolese politician who has been Prefect of Plateaux Department since 2012. A leading member of the Congolese Labour Party (PCT), he was Secretary-General of the Pool Department from 2003 to 2012.

Political career
Diafouka-Bambela, born in Brazzaville in 1947, worked as a teacher. He joined the PCT in 1977.

At the PCT's Third Ordinary Congress, held on 27–31 July 1984, Diafouka-Bambela was elected to the 75-member PCT Central Committee.

Diafouka-Bambela was appointed as Secretary-General of the Pool Department on 30 October 2003. He was elected to the PCT Political Bureau in 2006.

In early 2011, Diafouka-Bambela was designated as First Vice-President of the Preparatory Committee for the PCT's Sixth Extraordinary Congress. At the Sixth Extraordinary Congress, held in July 2011, he was re-elected to the PCT's 51-member Political Bureau.

Diafouka-Bambela was appointed as Prefect of Plateaux Department on 5 January 2012, succeeding Claude-Maurice Malela Soba. He was installed in his post as Prefect by Raymond Mboulou, the Minister of the Interior, on 20 January 2012.

References

Republic of the Congo politicians
Living people
1947 births
Congolese Party of Labour politicians
People from Brazzaville